Dickson Lafayette Hendley (August 6, 1926 – October 31, 2014) was an American football blocking back who played for the Pittsburgh Steelers. He played college football at Clemson University, having previously attended Greenville High School. Hendley's grandson is professional golfer Lucas Glover.

References

1926 births
2014 deaths
American football running backs
Clemson Tigers football players
Pittsburgh Steelers players
Players of American football from South Carolina
People from Greer, South Carolina
Greenville Senior High School (Greenville, South Carolina) alumni